The Gérin-Lajoie family is a French-Canadian family descended from Jean Gérin dit La joie, a sergeant in the troops of the military forces of Louis-Joseph de Montcalm, in New France, who arrived in Canada around 1750.
Several members of the family have been notable members of the legal, social and intellectual communities of Quebec since the 19th century.

Notable members 

 Antoine Gérin dit Lajoie, a poet, married to Marie-Amable Gélinas
 André Gérin, dit la Joie (in Yamachiche, – , in Yamachiche)
  André Gérin-Lajoie (in Yamachiche, – ?), married to Ursule Caron, daughter of Charles Caron.
  Charles Gérin-Lajoie (in Yamachiche, – , in Trois-Rivières), member of the House of Commons of Canada for Saint-Maurice. He married Élizabeth Dupont on September 19, 1843.
 Antoine Gérin-Lajoie (in Yamachiche, – , in Ottawa), lawyer and novelist
 Léon Gérin (in Quebec City, – , in Montreal), Quebec's first sociologist, president of the Royal Society of Canada
 Elzéar Gérin (in Yamachiche, – , in Montreal), married Marie-Agathe-Élodie Dufresne on October 14, 1873.
 Denis Gérin
 Henri Gérin-Lajoie (in Quebec City – ), lawyer and bâtonnier of Quebec. He married the pioneering feminist Marie Lacoste (known as Marie Lacoste Gérin-Lajoie), the daughter of Alexandre Lacoste, in 1887
 Marie Gérin-Lajoie (in Montreal, – , in Montreal), social worker and founder of a religious community
 Henri Gérin-Lajoie II ( – )
  Paul Gérin-Lajoie (in Montreal, – , in Montreal), politician and creator of the Gérin-Lajoie doctrine.

References

See also 
 Gérin-Lajoie

 
Canadian families